United Sikhs is a civil and human rights, humanitarian aid non profit organization and disaster relief non-governmental organization which is also a United Nations affiliated group. The concept of United Sikhs was conceived in 1999 by three Sikh Americans. It is international in scope and aims to help people regardless of color, race, gender, nationality or creed.

References

External links

Political advocacy groups in the United States
Legal advocacy organizations in the United States
Sikhism in the United States
Sikhism in New York (state)
Organizations established in 1999
1999 establishments in New York (state)
Sikh organisations